Caballo may refer to:

Places
 Caballo, New Mexico
 Caballo Island (in the Philippines)
 Caballo Lake
 Caballo Mountain, Spain
 Caballo Mountains, New Mexico, USA

Other uses
 Caballero, one of the face cards in a Spanish playing card deck